11 O'Clock is a 1948 action film directed by Homi Wadia. It starred Fearless Nadia, John Cawas, Atish Sayani and Aftab. The Austin car, which was a regular in most Fearless Nadia films, was given a billing with the main cast as "Austin Ki Bacchi" (daughter of Austin). The music was composed by Chitragupta. Homi Wadia had left Wadia Movietone, having parted ways with his brother JBH Wadia and started his own film company called Basant Pictures. He was to continue with the action genre, but produced more mythological films under this banner. His co-sponsor was M. B. Billimoria, who also distributed the film.

Plot

Suresh (John Cawas) has been left  by his uncle in his will. The stipulation is that he has to be married and reach the lawyer's office by 11 O'Clock the next morning. The money will otherwise go to his cousin Harish. He entreats Harish to help him find a bride, but under the pretense of helping him, Harish tries to foil his plans. With help from Lakshmi (Fearless Nadia) and a friend called Tattu, who has the Austin, they manage to make it on time.

Cast
Fearless Nadia as Lakshmi
John Cawas as Suresh
Atish Sayani
Aftab

Production

Homi Wadia made 152 films under his Basant Pictures banner. Most were mythological, and several were action-adventure films starring Fearless Nadia. He made use of the same sets several times to save money. Like all his other action films, this too had Nadia doing her stunts, fist raised in the air, western clothes, running over trains, fist-fighting bad guys and hefting them on her shoulders, to make the formula-driven genre be understood and accepted by the audiences by just seeing the poster.

Soundtrack
The film's music was composed by Chitragupta, with lyrics written by Rajjan.

References

External links

1948 films
Indian black-and-white films
Films directed by Homi Wadia
1940s action adventure films
Indian action adventure films
1940s Hindi-language films
Films scored by Chitragupta